The canton of Noyers-sur-Jabron is a former administrative division in southeastern France. It was disbanded following the French canton reorganisation which came into effect in March 2015. It consisted of 7 communes, which joined the canton of Sisteron in 2015. It had 1,425 inhabitants (2012).

The canton comprised the following communes:
Bevons
Châteauneuf-Miravail
Curel
Noyers-sur-Jabron
Les Omergues
Saint-Vincent-sur-Jabron
Valbelle

Demographics

See also
Cantons of the Alpes-de-Haute-Provence department

References

Former cantons of Alpes-de-Haute-Provence
2015 disestablishments in France
States and territories disestablished in 2015